Grant Morgan may refer to:

Grant Morgan (activist), New Zealand activist
Grant Morgan (American football) (born 1998), American football player
Grant Morgan (cricketer) (born 1971), South African cricketer